The 2008 Worcester City Council election took place on 1 May 2008 to elect members of Worcester City Council in Worcestershire, England. One third of the council was up for election and the council stayed under no overall control.

After the election, the composition of the council was:
Conservative 17
Labour 13
Liberal Democrat 3
Independent 2

Campaign
Before the election the Conservatives ran the council as a minority administration, and required one extra seat in order to win a majority. They had lost their majority after Labour gained a seat from them in a by-election in 2007. 12 seats were up for election with 5 Conservative, 4 Labour, 2 independent and 1 Liberal Democrat seats being contested. The Conservatives only contested 10 of the 12 seats after they decided not to oppose the two independents who were up for re-election in Nunnery and St John wards, however both they and the independent councillors denied that any deal had been done.

Three members of the Shadow Cabinet, including the Shadow Chancellor George Osborne, visited Worcester to campaign for the Conservatives.

Election result
The results saw the council remain without any party having a majority with the Conservatives continuing to run the administration. They had come within 28 votes of winning in Arboretum ward but Labour's Joy Squires held the seat.

The Green Party contested ten of the twelve seats, falling back slightly overall from 9.2 to 8.5% of the vote. Its claim of 10% related to the seats it contested. While it failed to win a seat, its best results were in the Rainbow Hill and Cathedral wards, where it scored 23.3 and 18.6% respectively.

Ward results

References

2008
2008 English local elections
2000s in Worcestershire